In computer science, concurrency semantics is a way to give meaning to concurrent systems in a mathematically rigorous way. Concurrency semantics is often based on mathematical theories of concurrency such as various process calculi, the actor model, or Petri nets.

Semantics
Formal methods